David Tanner (born 30 September 1984) is an Australian former professional road cyclist, who rode professionally between 2009 and 2018 for six different teams.

Career
In December 2014 he was announced as part of the squad for the  team for 2015, alongside fellow  rider Stef Clement. In September 2016, shortly before the disbanding of the IAM squad, Tanner suffered multiple injuries after being hit by a car whilst training, resulting in him spending three weeks in intensive care.

Major results

2005
 2nd Boucle de l'Artois
 5th Overall Circuit des Ardennes
 10th Grand Prix de Waregem
2007
 2nd Overall Tour du Gévaudan
1st Stage 1
 2nd La Roue Tourangelle
 3rd Overall Ronde de l'Oise
 4th Boucle de l'Artois
2008
 4th Overall Boucles de la Mayenne
 4th Gran Premio Città di Camaiore
2009
 10th Overall Herald Sun Tour
2010
 Tour of Utah
1st  Sprints classification
1st Stage 1
 1st Stage 2 Tour de Beauce
 2nd Overall Tour of China
1st Stage 2
2011
 5th Overall Ster ZLM Toer
 10th Hel van het Mergelland
2015
 1st Stage 2 Tour of Austria
 9th Gran Premio di Lugano
2016
 3rd Grand Prix of Aargau Canton

References

External links

David Tanner profile at Saxo Bank-SunGard

1984 births
Living people
Australian male cyclists
Cyclists from Melbourne